Janina Antonina Lewandowska (22 April 1908 – 22 April 1940) was a Polish World War II pilot murdered in the Katyn massacre by Soviet forces.

Early life
Lewandowska (née Dowbor-Muśnicka) was born 22 April 1908, in Kharkiv in the Russian Empire. Her father, Józef Dowbor-Muśnicki, was a successful Polish military general. As a teenager, she joined the Poznań Flying Club and earned her glider and parachutist certificates. At the age of 20, she became the first European woman to parachute from a height of over five kilometers. She learned to fly light aircraft by 1937. Shortly before the war began, she married instructor-pilot Mieczyslaw Lewandowski.

Military career
In August 1939, Lewandowska was drafted for service with the 3rd Military Aviation Regiment stationed near Poznań, Poland. On 22 September, her unit was taken prisoner by Soviet forces. Lewandowska was one of only two officers in the group; both were taken to the POW Camp for Polish Officers in Kozelsk, Russia. Her fate is uncertain, although it seems likely she died in the Katyn massacre, which occurred in the month of her 32nd birthday.

Commemorations 
 At the base of a monument erected in Lusów in 2015 to General Józef Dowbor-Muśnicki, both of his daughters are also commemorated: "Janina Lewandowska, murdered in 1940 by the NKVD in Katyn, and Agnieszka Dowbor-Muśnicka, murdered by the Germans in Palmiry." 

 On 19 March 2020, the National Bank of Poland introduced a commemorative silver coin with a face value of 10 zlotys. The coin, called "Katyń-Palmiry 1940," remembers the two murdered sisters. On one side of the coin, Janina appears next to the word "Katyn." The other side features a likeness of Agnieszka and the word "Palmiry."

See also 
History of Poland (1939–1945)

References

Sources

1908 births
1940 deaths
Military personnel from Kharkiv
People from Kharkov Governorate
People from the Russian Empire of Polish descent
Polish World War II pilots
Katyn massacre victims
Polish Air Force officers
Polish aviators
Polish military personnel killed in World War II
Women aviators
Women military aviators